The Sparrow is a 1967 play by British playwright Alan Ayckbourn. It has since been withdrawn from production by Ayckbourn.

Synopsis
In The Sparrow Ed brings home Evie, who he has just met after having had a one-night stand with his flatmate Tony's wife, Julia. Tony takes revenge on both Ed and Julia by employing Evie in a non-existent business.

Main characters
Ed, a bus conductor
Evie, a young woman whom Ed met at a dance
Tony, a businessman, Ed's flatmate
Julia, Tony's wife

Productions
Ayckbourn directed the world première of The Sparrow on 13 July 1967 at the Library Theatre Scarborough, with the following cast:

Evie - Pamela Craig
Ed - John Nettles
Tony - Robert Powell
Julia - Heather Stoney

References

External links
The Sparrow on official Ayckbourn site

1967 plays
Plays by Alan Ayckbourn